Adlington railway station serves the village of Adlington, near Chorley in Lancashire, England. It is a two-platform station on the - -  line. This is part of the Northern service link between Preston and Manchester via Bolton and Chorley.

Until 1960 Adlington was also served by a station named White Bear (on the Lancashire Union Railway).

History
On 15 June 1837 by act of Parliament, the Bolton and Preston Railway Company constructed a link with the Manchester line comprising nine and a half miles of railway to a temporary terminus at Rawlinson Lane. By December 1841 the line had reached Chorley and Adlington station opened to take over from Rawlinson Bridge.

The line would pass into the hands London, Midland and Scottish Railway during the Grouping of 1923. The line then passed on to the London Midland Region of British Railways on nationalisation in 1948.

When Sectorisation was introduced, the station was served by Regional Railways until the Privatisation of British Rail.

Facilities
The station has a staffed ticket office, open from start of service until 13:10 Mondays to Saturday. A ticket vending machine is in place for purchase of tickets or promise to pay coupons when the ticket office is closed and for the collection of pre-paid tickets. A waiting room is available in the main building when the booking office is open and there are shelters on each platforms. Train running information is provided by timetable posters and telephone, as well as newly installed electronic displays in the waiting shelters on both platforms. There is step-free access to both platforms however there is no tactile paving on the northbound platform. Platform 2, for services towards Manchester can only be accessed by a steep ramp which is not suitable for wheelchairs.

Services

Saturday and Sunday services were replaced by buses most weekends from May 2015 until November 2018 due to the late-running electrification work on the route. Weekend services resumed on Sunday 11 November 2018 after the completion of the electrification engineering work.

Since 2019, all train services have been provided by electric multiple units.

Renovation and electrification

It was announced by the Department for Transport in December 2009, the line between Preston and Manchester, on which the station is situated, would be electrified enabling a reduction in journey times to Manchester by up to ten minutes. There have been many delays but completion was in December 2018 when test trains (Virgin Pendolino) finally ran between Preston and Manchester.

Electric service commenced on 11 February 2019 utilising Class 319 electric multiple units.

References

 
 
 
 Station on navigable O.S. map

External links

Railway stations in Chorley
DfT Category F2 stations
Former Lancashire and Yorkshire Railway stations
Railway stations in Great Britain opened in 1841
Northern franchise railway stations
1841 establishments in England
Adlington, Lancashire